The Supreme Court of the German Democratic Republic was the highest judicial organ of the GDR. It was set up in 1949 and was housed on Scharnhorststraße 6 in Berlin. The building now houses the district court in Berlin, Germany 2 Instance and the District Court Berlin-Mitte. In the early days, 14 judges made up the court.

Responsibilities
Among the responsibilities of the court included 
 The conduct of criminal proceedings in the first body, in which the Supreme Public Prosecutor of the Republic because of the paramount importance of prosecuting cases before the Supreme Court raised
 Cassation in civil and criminal matters
 vocation against decisions of acquittal for annulment actions of Office for invention and patent system in patent invalidity matters.

Later other tasks were added, mainly due to the process of simplification which is attributable to the pace of DDR-Justiz.

A constitutional court and special administrative, social and financial judicial branches did not exist in the GDR.

Notable figures
 Presidents:  (1949–1960, NDPD),  (1960–86, CDU),  (1986–1989, SED)
 Vice President: Hilde Benjamin (1949–1953, SED); Vice President and Chairman of the College of Criminal Law: Walter Ziegler, (new 1st Vice President) Guenter Sarge (1977–1986)
 Chairman of the College in civil, family and employment law: Werner Strasberg Mountain
 General Prosecutors: Ernst Melsheimer (1949–1960, SED), Josef Streit (1962–1986), Guenter Wendland (1986–1989), Harri Harland (1989 / 1990), Hans-Juergen Joseph (1-6/1990);

East German law
Government of East Germany
East Germany, Supreme Court of
1949 establishments in East Germany
Defunct courts
1990 disestablishments in East Germany
Courts in Germany
Courts and tribunals established in 1949
Courts and tribunals disestablished in 1990